Fred W. Bennion (September 29, 1884 – January 18, 1960) was an American football player and coach of football, basketball and baseball. He served as the head football coach at the University of Utah from 1910 to 1913 and at the Agricultural College of the State of Montana—now Montana State University—from 1914 to 1917, compiling a career college football record of 27–15–8. Bennion was also the head basketball coach at Brigham Young University (BYU) from 1908 to 1910, at Utah from 1911 to 1914, and at Montana Agricultural from 1914 to 1919, amassing a career college basketball record of 96–31. In addition, He was the head baseball coach at BYU from 1909 to 1912, tallying a mark of 11–10.

A native of Murray, Utah, Bennion was a graduate of the University of Pennsylvania and the University of Utah. He also studied agriculture at Montana State. Following his coaching career, he worked as an agricultural agent in Umatilla County, Oregon and Montana during the 1920s. He was later the director of the Montana Taxpayers Association. From 1946 to 1955, Bennion served as the executive director of the Colorado Pueblo Expenditures Council in Denver. He died on January 18, 1960, at his home in Denver, following a short illness.

Head coaching record

Football

References

External links
 

1884 births
1960 deaths
BYU Cougars baseball coaches
BYU Cougars men's basketball coaches
Montana State Bobcats football coaches
Montana State Bobcats men's basketball coaches
Utah Utes football coaches
Utah Utes football players
Utah Utes men's basketball coaches
Montana State University alumni
University of Pennsylvania alumni
People from Murray, Utah
Coaches of American football from Utah
Players of American football from Detroit
Players of American football from Utah
Baseball coaches from Utah
Basketball coaches from Utah